Chungyu University of Film and Arts is a private university located in Xinyi District, Keelung, Taiwan.

CYUFA offers undergraduate and graduate degree programs in film and television, animation, digital media, visual communication design, and performing arts. 

The university has five colleges: College of Film and Television, College of Animation and Digital Arts, College of Design, College of Performing Arts, and College of General Education.

History
Chungyu University of Film and Arts was originally established in 1967 as the Chungyu Junior College of Business Administration. On 1 August 2003, the school was upgraded to the Chungyu Institute of Technology (CIT). On 1 August 2017, the school changed its name to the Chungyu University of Film and Arts.

Faculties
 Department of Accounting Information
 Department of Applied Foreign Languages
 Department of Business Administration
 Department of Finance
 Department of Financial and Economic Law
 Department of Information Law
 Department of Information Management
 Department of International Business
 Department of Leisure, Recreation and Tourism Management
 Department of Multimedia and Game Science
 Department of Visual Communication Design

Notable natives
 Hsing Hui, actress

Transportation
The university is accessible within walking distance east from Keelung Station of the Taiwan Railways.

See also
 List of universities in Taiwan

References

External links

  

 
Universities and colleges in Taiwan
Technical universities and colleges in Taiwan